Ağören can refer to:

 Ağören, Bayburt
 Ağören, Tercan